The Tucson artifacts, sometimes called the Tucson Lead Crosses, Tucson Crosses, Silverbell Road artifacts, or  Silverbell artifacts, were thirty-one lead objects that Charles E. Manier and his family found in 1924 near Picture Rocks, Arizona, that were initially thought by some to be created by early Mediterranean civilizations that had crossed the Atlantic in the first century, but were later determined to be a hoax.

The find consisted of thirty-one lead objects, including crosses, swords, and religious/ceremonial paraphernalia, most of which bore Hebrew or Latin engraved inscriptions, pictures of temples, leaders' portraits, angels,  and a dinosaur (inscribed on the lead blade of a sword). One contained the phrase "Calalus, the unknown land", which was used by believers as the name of the settlement. The objects also have Roman numerals ranging from 790 to 900 inscribed on them, which were sometimes interpreted to represent the date of their creation.  The site contains no other artifacts, no pottery sherds, no broken glass, no human or animal remains, and no sign of hearths or housing.

History
On September 13, 1924, Charles Manier and his father stopped to examine some old lime kilns while driving northwest of Tucson on Silverbell Road. Between 1924 and 1930 additional objects were extracted from the caliche, a layer of soil in which the soil particles have been cemented together by lime. Caliche often takes a long period of time to form, but it can be made and placed around an article in a short period of time, according to a report written by James Quinlan, a retired Tucson geologist who had worked for the U.S. Geological Survey. Quinlan also concluded that it would be easy to bury articles in the soft, silt material, and associated caliche in the lime kiln where the objects were found at the margin of prior trenches. The objects were believed, by their discoverer and main supporters, to be of a Roman Judeo-Christian colony existing in what is now known as Arizona between 790 and 900 AD. No other find has been formally established as placing any Roman colony in the area, nor anywhere else in North America.

In November 1924, Manier brought his friend Thomas Bent to the site and Bent was quickly convinced of the authenticity of the discovery. Upon finding the land was not owned, he immediately set up residence there, in order to homestead the property. Bent felt there was money to be made in further excavating the site.

Latin inscriptions

After his find, Manier took the cross to Professor Frank H. Fowler, Head of the Department of Classical Languages of the University of Arizona, at Tucson, who determined the language on the artifacts was Latin. He also translated one line as reading "Calalus, the unknown land", giving a name for the supposed Latin colony.

The Latin inscriptions on the alleged artifacts supposedly record the conflicts of the leaders of Calalus against a barbarian enemy known as the "Toltezus",  which some have interpreted as a supposed reference to the Mesoamerican Toltec civilization. However, the Latin on the artifacts appears to either be badly inflected original Latin, or inscriptions brazenly plagiarized from Classical authors such as Virgil, Cicero, Livy, Cornelius Nepos, and Horace, among several others. This has led many experts to condemn the artifacts as frauds. What is perhaps most suspicious, however, is that most of the inscriptions are identical to what appeared in widely available Latin grammar books, like Harkness's Latin Grammar and Allen and Greenough's Latin Grammar, as well as dictionaries like The Standard Dictionary of Facts.

Views on authenticity
Manier took the first item to the Arizona State Museum to be studied by archaeologist Karl Ruppert. Ruppert was impressed with the item, and went with Manier to the site the next day where he found a caliche plaque weighing , with inscriptions that included a date of 800 A.D.  A total of thirty-one objects were found. Other contemporary scholars including George C. Valliant, a Harvard University archaeologist who visited the University of Arizona in 1928, and Bashford Dean, curator of arms and armor at the Metropolitan Museum of Art in New York City, thought the articles were fakes. Neil Merton Judd, curator of the National Museum at the Smithsonian Institution, happened to be in Tucson at the time of the discovery of the objects and, after examining them, also thought they were fakes, proposing that they may have been created by "some mentally incompetent individual with a flair for old Latin and the wars of antiquity."

Supporters
In the 1960s, Bent wrote a 350-page manuscript entitled "The Tucson Artifacts," about the objects, which is unpublished but kept by the Arizona State Museum.   Both Manier and Bent were supporters of the objects as a genuine archaeological find.

Lara Coleman Ostrander, a Tucson immigrant and high school history teacher studied the historical background of the research, and translated the alleged history of Calalus from the writings on the items. Geologist Clifton J. Sarle worked with Ostrander to present the Tucson Artifacts to the press and the academic profession.

Tucson University administrator and director of the Arizona State Museum Dean Byron Cummings led archaeologists at the university to the location where the items were found. He brought ten of the objects to the American Association for the Advancement of Science and showing them at museums and universities on the east coast. Astronomer Andrew E. Douglass, known for his work in dendrochronology also considered the items to be authentic.

In 1975, Wake Forest University professor Cyclone Covey re-examined the controversy in his book titled Calalus: A Roman Jewish Colony in America from the Time of Charlemagne Through Alfred the Great. Covey was in direct contact with Thomas Bent by 1970, and planned to carry out excavations at the site in 1972, but was not allowed, due to legal complications preventing Wake Forest University from leading a dig at the site. Covey's book proposes that the objects are from a Jewish settlement, founded by people who came from Rome and settled outside of present-day Tucson around 800 AD.

Skeptics
Professor Frank Fowler originally translated the Latin inscriptions on the first items and found that the inscriptions were from well known classical authors such as Cicero, Virgil and Horace. He researched local Latin texts available in Tucson at the time and found the inscriptions on the lead items to be identical to the texts available.

Dean Cumming's student and excavator, Emil Haury, closely examined scratches on the surface of the objects as they were removed from the ground and concluded that they were planted, based partly on a cavity in the ground which was longer than a lead bar removed from it. After Cummings became president of the university, his views changed in an unclear manner, possibly due to Haury's skepticism, or the increasing sentiment that the items were nothing more than a hoax and as university president had to take a different stand on the matter. George M. B. Hawley staunchly opposed Bent's views about the objects. Hawley even accused Ostrander and Sarle as perpetrators of the hoax.

Possible creator
A local news article identified Timoteo Odohui as the possible creator of the items. Odohui was a young Mexican sculptor who lived near the site in the 1880s. The article mentions his possible connection to the site and his ability to craft lead objects. Bent wrote that a craftsman in the area had recalled the boy, his love for sculpture of soft metals and his collection of books on foreign languages, and told the excavators this.

In popular culture
H. P. Lovecraft alludes to the Tucson artifacts in "The Mound," a short story ghost-written for Zealia Bishop. Archaeologist and Lovecraft scholar Marc A. Beherec argues that the items influenced some of Lovecraft's other writings.

The Tucson artifacts were featured on The History Channel show America Unearthed in the episode titled "The Desert Cross," on February 22, 2013.  This episode was criticised for its methodology, its ignorance (or deliberate omission) of the complete text on the crosses, and its conclusions.

See also

 Antillia
 Ironwood Forest National Monument

References

Archaeological artifacts
Pre-Columbian trans-oceanic contact
Pseudoarchaeology
Archaeological forgeries
Hoaxes in the United States